The 104th Division()(2nd Formation) was activated on February 26, 1951 from 6th Military Sub-district. The division was composed of:
310th Infantry Regiment (former 6th Security Regiment of Zhejiang Military District);
311th Infantry Regiment (local forces from 6th Military Sub-district);
312th Infantry Regiment (former 7th Security Regiment of Zhejiang Military District).

In May 1952 the division was reorganized as 6th Building Construction Division, all its regiments were redesignated as follow:
16th Building Construction Regiment (former 310th Infantry);
17th Building Construction Regiment (former 311th Infantry);
18th Building Construction Regiment (former 312th Infantry).

In 1953 the division was reorganized as 3rd Building Construction Corporation of Eastern China({).

In 1955 the corporation moved to Xi'an and renamed as 3rd Building Construction Corporation of Northeast({). In the same year the corporation was merged into 3rd Sanitary Facility Installation Corporation(). 

In April 1955 the corporation was demobilized.

References

建国后中国人民解放军步兵师的发展, http://club.xilu.com/zgjsyj/msgview-819697-74513.html
中国人民解放军八个建筑师简史, http://www.doc88.com/p-7035820990492.html

104
Construction divisions of the People's Liberation Army
Military units and formations established in 1951
Military units and formations disestablished in 1955
1951 establishments in China